Transalpina can refer to:

 Gallia Transalpina, a Roman province
 Wallachia, a medieval state
 Bohinj Railway, Transalpina - Bohinj Railway in Slovenia
 Transalpina (DN67C), a Trans-Carpathian Road in Romania